Leaning House was an independent record label in Dallas, Texas. It was founded by Mark Elliott and Keith Foerster and existed from 1994 until 1999.

Leaning House produced recordings by Earl Harvin, Shelley Carroll, Wessell Anderson, Donald Edwards, Fred Sanders, and the Fantastic Voices of Harmony. It closed in 1999 for financial reasons. Mark Elliott noted that jazz albums make up a small percentage of the music market.

Discography 
 BB001 – Marchel Ivery – Marchel's Mode (1994)
 BB002 – Earl Harvin – Trio/Quartet (1996)
 BB003 – Shelley Carrol – Self-Titled (1997)
 BB004 – Marchel Ivery – Meets Joey Defrancesco (1997)
 BB005 – Earl Harvin/Dave Palmer – Strange Happy (1997)
 BB006 – Fred Sanders – East of Vilbig (1997)
 BB007 – Donald Edwards – In the Vernacular (1998)
 BB008 – Wessell Anderson – Live at the Village Vanguard (1998)
 BB009 – Earl Harvin Trio – At the Gypsy Tea Room (1998)
 BB010 – Marchel Ivery – 3 (1999)

Unreleased
 Bedhead - Untitled Collection of Jazz Standards (1995)

Bibliography 
 Leaning House Poetry Vol. 1: A Compact Disk Anthology with Readings by the Poets (Dallas Leaning House Press, 1996). . .

References

American independent record labels
Record labels established in 1994
Jazz record labels
Companies based in Dallas